Spanish Americans (hispanoestadounidenses, or hispanonorteamericanos) are Americans whose ancestry originates wholly or partly from Spain. They are the longest-established European American group in the modern United States, with a very small group descending from those explorations leaving from Spain and the Viceroyalty of New Spain (modern Mexico), and starting in the early 1500s, of 42 of the future U.S. states from California to Florida; and beginning a continuous presence in Florida since 1565 and New Mexico since 1598.

Many Hispanic and Latino Americans (Hispanos being the oldest group) living in the United States have Spanish ancestral roots due to five centuries of Spanish colonial settlement and large-scale immigration of Hispanic groups after independence. By this criterion, these groups, and especially  white Hispanic and Latino Americans 12,579,626 (white alone, 20.3% of all Hispanics) largely overlap with "Spanish Americans", with the caveat that the former groups can also include European ancestries other than Spanish, and often Amerindian or African ancestry. 

However, the term "Spanish American" is used mostly to refer to Americans whose self-identified ancestry originates directly from Spain in the 20th century.

History

Immigration waves
	

Throughout the colonial times, there were a number of European settlements of Spanish populations in the present-day United States of America with governments answerable to Madrid. The first settlement on modern day U.S. soil was San Juan, Puerto Rico, in 1521, followed by St. Augustine, Florida (the oldest in the continental United States), in 1565, followed by others in New Mexico, California, Arizona, and Texas. In 1598, San Juan de los Caballeros was established, near present-day Santa Fe, New Mexico, by Juan de Oñate and about 1,000 other Spaniards from the Viceroyalty of New Spain.
Spanish immigrants also established settlements in San Diego, California (1602), San Antonio, Texas (1691) and Tucson, Arizona (1699). By the mid-1600s the Spanish in America numbered more than 400,000.

After the establishment of the American colonies, an additional 250,000 immigrants arrived either directly from Spain, the Canary Islands or, after a relatively short sojourn, from present-day central Mexico. These Spanish settlers expanded European influence in the New World. The Canary Islanders settled in bayou areas surrounding New Orleans in Louisiana from 1778 to 1783 and in San Antonio de Bejar, San Antonio, Texas, in 1731.

The earliest known Spanish settlements in the then northern Mexico were the result of the same forces that later led the English to come to North America. Exploration had been fueled in part by imperial hopes for the discovery of wealthy civilizations. In addition, like those aboard the Mayflower, most Spaniards came to the New World seeking land to farm, or occasionally, as historians have recently established, freedom from religious persecution. A smaller percentage of new Spanish settlers were descendants of Spanish Jewish converts and Spanish Muslim converts.

Basques stood out in the exploration of the Americas, both as soldiers and members of the crews that sailed for the Spanish. Prominent in the civil service and colonial administration, they were accustomed to overseas travel and residence. Many of them were also wealthy and prosperous merchants, constituting much of the upper class in Spanish colonial society. Another reason for their emigration besides the restrictive inheritance laws in the Basque Country, was the devastation from the Napoleonic Wars in the first half of the nineteenth century, which was followed by defeats in the two Carlist civil wars. (For more information about the Basque, and immigrants to the United States from this region, see Basque Americans.)

19th and 20th centuries 

Immigration to the United States from Spain was controversially minimal but steady during the first half of the nineteenth century, with an increase during the 1850s and 1860s resulting from the bloody warfare of the Carlist civil wars during the years of 1833–1876. Much larger numbers of Spanish immigrants entered the country in the first quarter of the twentieth century—27,000 in the first decade and 68,000 in the second—due to the same circumstances of rural poverty and urban congestion that led other Europeans to emigrate in that period, as well as unpopular wars-in this first wave of Spanish immigration. The Spanish presence in the United States declined sharply between 1930 and 1940 from a total of 110,000 to 85,000, because many immigrants returned to Spain after finishing their farmwork.

Beginning with the coup d'état against the Second Spanish Republic in 1936 and the devastating civil war that ensued, General Francisco Franco established a dictatorship for 40 years. At the time of his takeover, a small but prominent group of liberal intellectuals fled to the United States. After the civil war the country endured a period of autarky, as Franco believed that post-World War II Spain could survive or continue its activities without any European assistance.

In the mid-1960s, 44,000 Spaniards immigrated to the United States, as part of a second wave of Spanish immigration. In the 1960s and 1970s the economic situation improved in Spain, and Spanish immigration to the United States declined to about 3,000 per year. In the 1980s, as Europe enjoyed an economic boom, Spanish immigrants to the United States dropped to only 15,000. The 1990 U.S. census recorded 76,000 foreign-born Spaniards in the country, representing only four-tenths of a percent of the total populace. As from the rest of Europe, 21st century immigrants from Spain are few, only 10,000 per year at most.

Much as with French Americans, who are of French descent but mostly by way of Canada, the majority of the 41 million massively strong Spanish-speaking population have come by way of Latin America, especially Mexico, but also Puerto Rico, Dominican Republic, and other areas that the Spanish themselves colonized. Many of the Hispanic and Latino Americans bring their Spanish-speaking culture into the country.

Principal areas of settlement

Spanish Americans in the United States are found in large concentrations in five major states from 1940 through the early twenty-first century. In 1940, the highest concentration of Spaniards were in New York (primarily New York City), followed by California, Florida, New Jersey and Pennsylvania. The 1950 U.S. census indicated little change—New York with 14,705 residents from Spain and California with 10,890 topped the list. Spaniards spilled into New Jersey with 3,382, followed by Florida (3,382) and Pennsylvania (1,790). By 1990 and 2000, there was relatively little change except in the order of the states and the addition of Texas. In 1990, Florida ranked first with 78,656 Spanish immigrants followed by: California 74,784, New York (42,309), Texas (32,226), New Jersey (28,666). The 2000 U.S. census saw a significant decline in Spanish-origin immigrants. California now ranked highest (22,459), followed by, Florida (14,110 arriving from Spain), New York (13,017), New Jersey (9,183), Texas (7,202).

Communities in the United States, in keeping with their strong regional identification in Spain, have established ethnic organizations for Basques, Galicians, Asturians, Andalusians, and other such communities.

These figures show that there was never the mass emigration from Iberia that there was from Latin America. It is evident in the figures that Spanish immigration peaked in the 1910s and 1920s. The majority settled in Florida and New York, although there was also a sizable Spanish influx to West Virginia at the turn of the 20th century, mostly from Asturias. These Asturian immigrants worked in the U.S. zinc industry after having worked in the smelters of Real Compañía Asturiana de Minas in Arnao, on the north coast near Avilés.

It is likely that more Spaniards settled in Latin America than in the United States, due to common language, shared religion, and cultural ties.

Some of the first ancestors of Spanish Americans were Spanish Jews  who spoke Ladino, a language derived from Castilian Spanish and Hebrew.

In the 1930s and 1940s, Spanish immigration mostly consisted of refugees fleeing from the Spanish Civil War (1936–1939) and from the Franco military regime in Spain, which lasted until his death in 1975.  The majority of these refugees were businessmen and intellectuals, as well as union activists, and held strong liberal anti-authoritarian feelings.

California

A Californio (Spanish for "Californian") is a Spanish term for a descendant of a person of Spanish and Mexican ancestry who was born in Alta California. "Alta California" refers to the time of the first Spanish presence established by the Portolá expedition in 1769 until the region's cession to the United States of America in 1848.

Since 1945, others sometimes referred to as Californios (many appear in the "Notable Californios" section below) include:
Early Alta California immigrants who settled down and made new lives in the province, regardless of where they were born. This group is distinct from indigenous peoples of California. Descendants of Californios, especially those who married other Californios.

The military, religious and civil components of pre-1848 Californio society were embodied in the thinly-populated presidios, missions, pueblos and ranchos. After secularization, the Mexican authorities divided most of the mission lands into new ranchos and granted them to Mexican citizens (already present Californios) resident in California.

The Spanish colonial and later Mexican national governments encouraged settlers from the northern and western provinces of Mexico, whom Californios called "Sonorans." Small groups of people from other parts of Latin America (most notably Peru and Chile) also settled in California. However, only a few official colonization efforts (from New Spain) were ever undertaken—notably the second expeditions of Gaspar de Portolá (1770) and of Juan Bautista de Anza (1775–1776). Children of those few early settlers and retired soldiers became the first Californios. One genealogist estimated that, in 2004, between 300,000 and 500,000 Californians were descendants of Californios.

Florida

Juan Ponce de León, a Spanish conquistador, named Florida in honor of his discovery of the land on April 2, 1513, during Pascua Florida, a Spanish term for the Easter season. Pedro Menéndez de Avilés founded the city of St. Augustine in 1565; the first European-founded city in what is now the continental United States.

In the early 1880s, Tampa was an isolated village with a population of less than 1000 and a struggling economy. However, its combination of a good port, Henry Plant's new railroad line, and humid climate attracted the attention of Vicente Martinez Ybor, a prominent Spanish-born cigar manufacturer; the neighborhood of Ybor City was named after him.
The El Centro Español de Tampa remains one of the few surviving structures specific to Spanish immigration to the United States during the late 19th and early 20th centuries, a legacy that garnered the Centro Español building recognition as a U.S. National Historic Landmark (NHL) on June 3, 1988.

Hawaii

Spanish immigration to Hawaii began when the Hawaiian government and the Hawaiian Sugar Planters' Association (HSPA) decided to supplement their ongoing importation of Portuguese workers to Hawaii with workers recruited from Spain. Importation of Spanish laborers, along with their families, continued until 1913, at which time more than 9,000 Spanish immigrants had been brought in, most recruited to work primarily on the Hawaiian sugar plantations.

The importation of Spanish laborers to Hawaii began in 1907, when the British steamship SS Heliopolis arrived in Honolulu Harbor with 2,246 immigrants from the Málaga province of Spain. However, rumored poor accommodations and food on the voyage created political complications that delayed the next Spanish importation until 1911, when the SS Orteric arrived with a mixed contingent of 960 Spanish and 565 Portuguese immigrants, the Spanish having boarded at Gibraltar, and the Portuguese at Oporto and Lisbon. Although Portuguese immigration to Hawaii effectively ended after the arrival of the Orteric, the importation of Spanish laborers and their families continued until 1913, ultimately bringing to Hawaii a total of 9,262 Spanish immigrants.

Six ships between 1907 and 1913 brought over 9,000 Spanish immigrants from the Spanish mainland to Hawaii. Although many of the Portuguese immigrants who preceded them to Hawaii arrived on small wooden sailing ships of less than a thousand gross tonnage capacity, all of the ships involved in the Spanish immigration were large, steel-hulled, passenger steamships.

Louisiana

The majority of them descend from Canarian settlers who arrived in Louisiana between 1778 and 1783. Its members are descendants of colonists from the Canary Islands, which is part of Spain off the coast of Africa. They settled in Spanish Louisiana between and intermarried with other communities such as French, Acadians, Creoles, and other groups, mainly through the 19th and early 20th centuries. The Isleños originally settled in four communities including Galveztown, Valenzuela, Barataria, and San Bernardo. Following significant flooding of the Mississippi River in 1782, the Barataria settlement was abandoned and the survivors were relocated to San Bernardo and Valenzuela with some settling in West Florida.

New Mexico

Hispanos of New Mexico (less commonly referred to as Neomexicanos or Nuevomexicanos) are descendants of Spanish and Mexican colonists who settled the area of New Mexico and Southern Colorado. Most made the journey from New Spain, now principally modern Mexico. The vast majority of these settlers married and mixed with the local indigenous people of New Mexico. Like the Californios and Tejanos, the descendants of these early settlers still retain a community of thousands of people in this state and that of southern Colorado.

New Mexico belonged to Spain for most of its modern history (16th century – 1821) and later to Mexico (1821–1848). The original name of the region was Santa Fé de Nuevo Mexico. The descendants of the settlers still retain a community of thousands of people in this state. Also, there is a community of Nuevomexicanos in Southern Colorado, due to shared colonial history.
Currently, the majority of the Nuevomexicano population is distributed between New Mexico and Southern Colorado. Most of the Nuevomexicanos that live in New Mexico live in the northern half of the state. There are hundreds of thousands of Nuevomexicanos living in New Mexico. Those who claim to be descendants of the first Hispanic settlers in this state currently account as the first predominant ancestry in the state.

There is also a community of people in Southern Colorado descended from Nuevomexicanos that migrated there in the 19th century. The stories and language of the Nuevomexicanos from Northern New Mexico and Southern Colorado were studied by Nuevomexicano ethnographer, linguist, and folklorist Juan Bautista Rael and Aurelio Espinosa.

New York

"Little Spain" was a Spanish American neighborhood in the New York City borough of Manhattan during the 20th century.

Little Spain was on 14th Street, between Seventh and Eighth Avenues. A very different section of Chelsea existed on a stretch of 14th Street often referred to by residents as "Calle Catorce," or "Little Spain". The Church of Our Lady of Guadelupe (No. 299) was founded in 1902, when Spaniards started to settle in the area. Although the Spanish business have given way to such nightclubs as Nell's and Oh Johnny on the block between Seventh and Eighth Avenues, the Spanish food and gift emporium known as Casa Moneo has been at 210 West 14th since 1929. In 2010 the documentary Little Spain, directed and written by Artur Balder, was filmed in New York City. The documentary pulled together for first time an archive that reveals the untold history of the Spanish-American presence in Manhattan. They present the history of the streets of Little Spain in New York City throughout the 20th Century. The archive contains more than 450 photographs and 150 documents that have never been publicly displayed.

Other important commerces and Spanish business of Little Spain were restaurants like La Bilbaína, Trocadero Valencia, Bar Coruña, Little Spain Bar, Café Madrid, Mesón Flamenco, or El Faro Restaurant, established 1927, and still today open at 823 Greenwich St. The Iberia was a famous Spanish dress shop.

The heart of the Spanish American community in that area were the two landmarks: the Spanish Benevolent Society and the Roman Catholic Church of Our Lady of Guadalupe, founded at the turn of the 19th century, being the first parish in Manhattan with mass in Latin and Spanish.

Another area of influence is the Unanue family of Goya Foods. Its founder, Prudencio Unanue Ortiz, migrated from Spain in the 20th century and established Goya Foods, the largest Hispanic-owned food company in the United States. The family's members include Joseph A. Unanue and Andy Unanue. Goya Foods is the 377th largest private American company.

Culture

Many Spanish Americans still retain aspects of their culture. This includes Spanish food, drink, art, annual fiestas. Spaniards have contributed to a vast number of areas in the United States of America. The influence of Spanish cuisine is seen in the cuisine of the United States throughout the country.

Cuisine

In the early 20th century, Prudencio Unanue Ortiz and his wife Carolina established Goya Foods, the largest Hispanic-owned food company in the United States.

Spanish language in the U.S.

Spanish was the second European language spoken in North America after Old Norse, the language of the Viking settlers. It was brought to the territory of what is the contemporary United States of America in 1513 by Juan Ponce de León. In 1565, the Spaniards founded St. Augustine, Florida, the oldest, continuously occupied European settlement in the modern U.S. territory.

Like other descendants of European immigrants, Spaniards have adopted English as their primary language.

Religion

Main articles: Spanish missions in Arizona, California, Carolinas, Florida, Georgia, Louisiana, New Mexico, Texas, Ajacán Mission

Many Spanish Americans are more active in Catholic church activities than was common in past generations in Spain; they rarely change their religious affiliation and participate frequently in family-centered ecclesiastical rituals. In both Spain and the United States, events such as first communions and baptisms are felt to be important social obligations that strengthen clan identity.

Socioeconomics 
Since Spanish American entrance into the middle class has been widespread, the employment patterns described above have largely disappeared. This social mobility has followed logically from the fact that throughout the history of Spanish immigration to the United States, the percentage of skilled workers remained uniformly high. In the first quarter of the twentieth century, for example, 85 percent of Spanish immigrants were literate, and 36 percent were either professionals or skilled craftsmen. A combination of aptitude, motivation, and high expectations led to successful entry into a variety of fields.

Number of Spanish Americans

Censuses

1980

In 1980, 62,747 Americans claimed only Spaniard ancestry and another 31,781 claimed Spaniard along with another ethnic ancestry. 2.6 million or 1.43% of the total U.S. population chose to identify as "Spanish/Hispanic", however this represents a general type of response which will encompass a variety of ancestry groups. Spanish Americans are found in relative numbers throughout United States, particularly in the Southwestern and Gulf Coast. According to the 1980 U.S. census 66.4% reported Spaniard as their main ancestry, while 62.7% reported Spanish/Hispanic as their main ancestry.
The table showing those who self-identified as Spaniard are as follows: 

Note: Spaniard excludes Spanish Basque.

1990
At a national level the ancestry response rate was high with 90.4% of the total United States population choosing at least one specific ancestry, 11.0% did not specify their ancestry, while 9.6% ignored the question completely. Of those who chose Spaniard, 312,865 or 86.7% of people chose it as their first and main response. Totals for the 'Spaniard' showed a considerable increase from the previous census.
Percentage is the ancestry only within the U.S. state itself.

Note: Spaniard excludes Spanish Basque. As with the previous census 'Spanish' was considered a general response which may have encompassed a variety of ancestral groups. Over two million self-identified with this response.

2000

In 2000, 299,948 Americans specifically reported their ancestry as "Spaniard", which was a significant decrease over the 1990 data, where in those who reported "Spaniard" numbered 360,858. Another 2,187,144 reported "Spanish"
and 111,781 people, reported "Spanish American". To this figures we must adhere some groups of Spanish origin or descent that specified their origin, instead of in Spain, in some of the Autonomous communities of Spain, specially Spanish Basques (9,296 people), Castillians (4,744 people), Canarians (3,096 people), Balearics (2,554 people) and Catalans (1,738 people). Less of 300 people indicated be of Asturian, Andalusian, Galician, and Valencian origin.
 Spaniard – 299,948
 Spanish – 2,187,144 
 Spanish American – 111,781

2010
The 2010 census is the twenty-third United States national census.
 Spaniard – 635,253

Statistics for those who self-identify as ethnic Spaniard, Spanish, Spanish American in the 2010 American Community Survey.
 Spaniard – 694,494
 Spanish – 482,072
 Spanish American – 48,810

American Community Survey, 2013

Of the 759,781 people that reported Spaniard, 652,884 were native-born and 106,897 were foreign-born. 65.3% of the foreign-born were born in Europe, 25.1% were born in Latin America, 8.3% from Asia, 0.6% in Northern America, 0.5% in Africa, and 0.1% in Oceania.

 Spanish – 505,254
 Spanish American – 21,540
Top 10 states with the largest "Spaniard" ancestry in the 2013 American Community Survey:

In 2013, an estimated 746,000 Hispanics of Spanish origin were living in the United States, making them the ninth largest Hispanic origin population residing in the United States. This number also includes people who self-identify as Hispanic of Spanish origin, such as those who immigrated or have family or ancestors who immigrated from Spain.

Political participation 
With the outbreak of the Spanish Civil War in 1936 a number of intellectual political refugees found asylum in the United States. Supporters of the overthrown Spanish Republic, which had received aid from the Soviet Union while under attack from Nationalist forces, were sometimes incorrectly identified with communism, but their arrival in the United States well before the "red scare" of the early 1950s spared them the worst excesses of McCarthyism. Until the end of the dictatorship in Spain in 1975 political exiles in the United States actively campaigned against the abuses of the Franco regime.

Place names of Spanish origin

Some Spanish placenames in the U.S. include:
 Arizona – Possibly from a Spanish word of Basque origin meaning "The Good Oak". The toponym does not come from the term Zona Árida.

 Mesa - Means table, Spanish explorers used the word because the tops of mesas look like the tops of tables.
 Sierra Vista "Mountain View"
 California – The state was named for a mythical land described in a popular Spanish novel from around 1500, Las sergas de Esplandián (The exploits of Esplandián) by Garci Rodríguez de Montalvo.
 Alcatraz Island "Gannet Island"
 Chula Vista "Beautiful View"
 Los Angeles "City of Angels"
 Sacramento "City of the Sacrament"
 Santa Cruz "City of the Holy Cross".
 San Diego "Saint Didacus".
 San Francisco "Saint Francis".
 San Jose "Saint Joseph".
 Santa Barbara "Saint Barbara"
 Florida – "Flowery".
 Boca Raton – "Shallow inlet of sharp–pointed rocks that scrape a ship's cables",
 Key West – Anglicization of "Cayo Hueso" ("Bone Island")
 St. Augustine, Florida – Anglicization of " San Agustín" founded by Pedro Menéndez de Avilés.
 Sarasota - "Sheep skin"
 Biscayne Bay - Anglicization of "bayo Vizcayno" (Basque bay)
 Pensacola - Hispanicization of the indigenous name for the region
 Tampa - Hispanicization of the indigenous name for the region
 Miami - Hispanicization of the indigenous name for the region
 Colorado – "Reddish".
 Pueblo – "Town", 
 Alamosa – "Cottonwood"
 Antonito - "little Anthony"
 Montana – "Montaña", "Mountain".
 Lima - "Lime"
 New Mexico
 Albuquerque, New Mexico – First called La Villa de San Francisco Xavier de Alburquerque, was founded as a Royal city by order of Don Francisco Cuervo y Valdez, 34th Governor of New Mexico, on February 7, 1706.
 Española, New Mexico - "Spanish Woman"
 Santa Fe – "Holy Faith", 
Las Cruces – "The Crosses", 
Madrid – although pronounced "MAD–rid" the city was named for the capital of Spain
 Texas "Tejas" in Spanish and "slates" in English.
 El Paso "The Pass", 
Amarillo "Yellow", 
San Antonio "St. Anthony",
 Nevada – The name comes from the Spanish nevada , meaning "snow-covered", after the Sierra Nevada ("snow-covered mountain range").
 Las Vegas " The Meadows".
 Oregon – "Orejón", "big ear" or could come from "Aragón".
 Moro - "Moor"
 Bonanza - "prosperity"
 Estacada - "staked"
 Manzanita - "little apple"
 Toledo - Spanish city of the same name

Notable people

See also

About Spanish Americans 
 Spanish-American relations
 Spanish immigration to Hawaii
 Spanish cuisine
 Asturian Americans
 Canarian Americans
 Isleño
 Galician Americans
 Basque Americans
 Catalan Americans
 Floridanos
 Hispanos
 Californio
 Tejano
 Nuevomexicano (New Mexican Spanish)
 Origins of New Mexico Families: A Genealogy of the Spanish Colonial Period
 El Centro Español de Tampa
 Centro Asturiano de Tampa
 History of Ybor City

About Hispanic Americans and Spanish Canadians 
 White Americans
 White Hispanic and Latino Americans
 Spanish Canadians
 Criollo people
 Hispanic Society of America
 Notable Hispanics
 White Hispanic
 White Latin Americans
 Hispanic
 Hispanic and Latino Americans

References

Further reading
 Colahan, Clark. "Spanish Americans." Gale Encyclopedia of Multicultural America, edited by Thomas Riggs, (3rd ed., vol. 4, Gale, 2014), pp. 271–281. Online
 Martinelli, Phyllis Cancilla and Ana Varela-Lago (eds.), Hidden Out in the Open: Spanish Migration to the United States, 1875-1930. Louisville: University Press of Colorado, 2019.
 Ramírez, Roberto R. (2004). We the People: Hispanic Population in the United States. Census 2000 Special Reports. U.S. Census Bureau.

External links
  Hispanic Society of America Museum in New York City
 Colahan, Clark (2008). Spanish American Heritage. Multicultural America.
 Pérez, Juan M. (October 2005). The Hispanic Role in America. Coloquio Revista Cultural.
 Survey: 2005 American Community Survey:Hispanic Origin. U.S. Census Bureau.
 Asturian-American Migration Forum. A discussion board for the descendants of Asturian-Americans.

 
European-American society
Hispanic and Latino American
United States
Spain–United States relations